Charles Lacy South (July 22, 1892 – December 20, 1965) was a U.S. Representative from Texas.

Born on a farm near Damascus, Virginia. South moved with his parents to Callahan County, Texas, in 1898 and to Coleman County, Texas, in 1914.
He attended the public schools and Simmons College at Abilene, Texas, in 1915 and 1916.
He taught in the Coleman County, Texas, public schools 1914-1920.
He served as superintendent of schools of Coleman County 1921-1925.
He studied law and was admitted to the bar in 1925.
He served as county judge 1925-1931 and as district attorney for the thirty-fifth judicial district 1930-1934.

South was elected as a Democrat to the Seventy-fourth and to the three succeeding Congresses (January 3, 1935 – January 3, 1943).
He was an unsuccessful candidate for renomination in the first primary in 1942 and later withdrew.
He engaged in the practice of law in Coleman, Texas.
He served as member of the State house of representatives in 1947 and 1948.
He was a resident of Austin, Texas, from 1948 until his death there on December 20, 1965.
He was interred in Coleman Cemetery, Coleman, Texas.

Sources

1892 births
1965 deaths
Democratic Party members of the United States House of Representatives from Texas
Democratic Party members of the Texas House of Representatives
People from Austin, Texas
Texas state court judges
20th-century American judges
20th-century American politicians